John of Westphalia, also known as John of Paderborn, Johann von Westphalen and other spelling variations of Johannes, Paderborn and Westfalia (died 1498), was the first printer in Leuven and possibly in Flanders. He was born in Paderborn or Aachen and seems to have been first active in Venice, but returned to Germany and studied at the university of Cologne before moving to Flanders as a printer. He was active from 1473 in Aalst, working together with Dirk Martens on four books, and from 1474 in Leuven. He worked there in the University until 1498, producing at least 180 books. On his death in 1498, Dirk Martens bought his shop and settled in Leuven. John's brother Conrad of Westphalia was also a printer.

Works
Some of his works are:
1473: Gesta Romanorum
1474: Antonius Guainerius, Commentariolus de pleuresi
1474: Pedrus de Crescentiis, Liber ruralium commodorum
1475: Justinian
1475: Cicero, Brutus
1475: Leonardo Bruni, Ethica
1475-1476: Virgil
1480: Guido delle Colonne, Historia destructionis Troiae
1483: Agricola, Axiochos
1483: Cicero, De officiis

Notes

15th-century births
1498 deaths
Printers of incunabula
Belgian printers